Svea Holst (20 April 1901 – 28 April 1996) was a Swedish film actress. She appeared in more than 50 films between 1923 and 1987.

Selected filmography
 Nothing But the Truth (1939)
  Kristin Commands (1946)
 Crisis (1946)
 A Ship to India (1947)
 Rail Workers (1947)
 Music in Darkness (1948)
 Son of the Sea (1949)
 The Street (1949)
 Pimpernel Svensson (1950)
 The Saucepan Journey (1950)
 U-Boat 39 (1952)
 The Clang of the Pick (1952)
 The Road to Klockrike (1953)
 Ursula, the Girl from the Finnish Forests (1953)
 Café Lunchrasten (1954)
 Simon the Sinner (1954)
 Storm Over Tjurö (1954)
Taxi 13 (1954)
 The Light from Lund (1955)
 The Unicorn (1955)
 The Biscuit (1956)
 More Than a Match for the Navy (1958)
 A Lion in Town (1959)
 On a Bench in a Park (1960)
 Sten Stensson Returns (1963)
 The Passion of Anna (1969)
 Elvis! Elvis! (1976)
 Rasmus på luffen (1981)
 Sally and Freedom (1981)
 Fanny and Alexander (1982)
 Två killar och en tjej (1983)

References

External links

1901 births
1996 deaths
Swedish film actresses
20th-century Swedish actresses